Bolila Airport  is an airport serving Bolila, a village on the Congo River in Tshopo Province, Democratic Republic of the Congo.

See also

 Transport in the Democratic Republic of the Congo
 List of airports in the Democratic Republic of the Congo

References

External links
 OpenStreetMap - Bolila Airport
 OurAirports - Bolila Airport
 FallingRain - Bolila Airport
 HERE Maps - Bolila
 

Airports in Tshopo